Gemini G.E.L., formally Gemini Ltd., is an artists‘ workshop, exhibition space, and publisher of limited edition prints and sculptures, located at 8365 Melrose Avenue in Los Angeles, California.

History 
Gemini Ltd. was founded in 1965 by master printer Kenneth E. Tyler, who was an alumnus of the Tamarind Lithography Workshop (now Tamarind Institute) founded by June Wayne. Several months later, he was joined by two business partners, Sidney Felsen and Stanley Grinstein, and together they launched Gemini G.E.L. (Graphic Editions Ltd.) on January 1, 1966. The workshop has collaborated with artists such as Robert Rauschenberg, Isamu Noguchi, Robert Motherwell, Roy Lichtenstein, Julie Mehretu, Willem de Kooning, Claes Oldenburg, and Ed Ruscha, among many others, to create editioned multiples in media including lithography, etching, screenprinting, woodcut and a wide variety of sculptural materials.

In 1981, the National Gallery of Art in Washington, D.C. established the Gemini G.E.L. Archive, which functions as a study center for scholars and collectors, and contains a complete history of the workshop. Twenty-two artists were represented in the initial gift, including Jasper Johns, Rauschenberg, Oldenburg, David Hockney and Lichtenstein. Further gifts by donors are expected to provide a complete representation of prints published by Gemini since its founding.

Artists who made prints at Gemini G.E.L.

References

External links
 Gemini G.E.L. website
 Online Gemini Catalogue Raisonné

Art in California
Printmaking groups and organizations
Contemporary art organizations
American artist groups and collectives